Following are the results of the 1951 Soviet Top League football championship.  Fifteen teams took part, with CDSA Moscow winning the championship.

League standings

Results

Top scorers
16 goals
 Avtandil Gogoberidze (Dinamo Tbilisi)

15 goals
 Konstantin Beskov (Dynamo Moscow)
 Aleksandr Ponomarev (Shakhtyor Stalino)

14 goals
 Fyodor Dashkov (Dynamo Kiev)

13 goals
 Aleksei Kolobov (Dynamo Leningrad)
 Sergei Korshunov (VVS Moscow)

12 goals
 Zaur Kaloyev (Spartak Tbilisi)
 Viktor Zhylin (Zenit Leningrad)

10 goals
 Gennadi Bondarenko (Dynamo Leningrad)
 Aleksei Grinin (CDSA Moscow)
 Nikita Simonyan (Spartak Moscow)
 Vyacheslav Solovyov (CDSA Moscow)
 Vasili Trofimov (Dynamo Moscow)
 Pavel Vinkovatov (Dynamo Kiev)
 Viktor Voroshilov (Krylia Sovetov Kuybyshev)

References

 Soviet Union - List of final tables (RSSSF)

1949
1
Soviet
Soviet